In spherical astronomy, quadrature is the configuration of a celestial object in which its elongation is perpendicular to the direction of the Sun. It is applied especially to the position of a superior planet or the Moon at its first and last quarter phases. This is not to be confused with the Moon at dichotomy (exactly half-lit) as viewed from Earth, which occurs at 89.85 degrees and 270.15 degrees.

As shown in the diagram, a planet (or other object) can be at the western quadrature (when it is to the west of the Sun when viewed from the Earth) or at the eastern quadrature (when it is to the east of the Sun when viewed from the Earth). Note that an inferior planet can never be at quadrature to the reference planet.

At quadrature, the shadow that a planet casts on its planetary rings or moons appears most offset from the planet (e.g., Saturn's rings); the dark side of a planet (e.g., Mars) is maximally visible.

See also
 Astrological aspect

References
Attribution

Astrological aspects
Celestial mechanics
Observational astronomy
Orbits
Spherical astronomy
First quarter moon